Hepatitis Bathtub is an EP by NOFX released on December 23, 2016 through Fat Wreck Chords. The EP was released as a four-song 7". The EP was recorded in a basement in Omaha, Nebraska in 1987 by Dereck Higgins (of Omaha punk band R.A.F.) and consists of never re-recorded songs of NOFX. It was also available as a deluxe package in limited edition color vinyl with a hardcover copy of NOFX's book The Hepatitis Bathtub and Other Stories and a NOFX towel. The Hepatitis Bathtub and Other Stories was eventually released in April 2016.

Track listing 
 "Too Mixed Up"
 "Nothing But a Nightmare" (Rudimentary Peni Cover)
 "Young Drunk and Stupid"
 "No Problems/Death of a Friend"

Performers 
 Erik Sandin - drums
 Dave Casillas - guitar
 Eric Melvin - guitar, vocals
 Fat Mike - vocals, bass

References 

2016 EPs
Fat Wreck Chords EPs
NOFX EPs